The Ghastly Love of Johnny X is a 2012 American musical science fiction comedy film written, produced, and directed by Paul Bunnell. It stars Will Keenan, Creed Bratton, and De Anna Joy Brooks, Reggie Bannister, Les Williams, Jed Rowen and features, in supporting roles, Kate Maberly, Paul Williams and Kevin McCarthy  It was the last feature film shot in Kodak Plus-X.

It was the last film featuring Kevin McCarthy, who died two years before its release.

The film is an homage to 1950s’ sci-fi, teen and the rock and roll of the era. It follows the adventures of Johnny X, an alien on Earth who is chasing his ex-girlfriend after she steals his powerful invention: the resurrection suit.

Plot
Johnny X (Will Keenan) is an alien banished to Earth with his loyal followers. They take up the guise of a greaser gang and drive through the desert. Meanwhile, at a diner, a woman named Bliss (De Anna Joy Brooks) - who is Johnny's ex-girlfriend - asks an employee named Chip (Les Williams) to run away with her. Johnny and his gang show up and Johnny uses a glove with mysterious powers to control Bliss. Chip manages to back a car up over the glove, breaking it and freeing Bliss.

Chip and Bliss escape to an empty drive-in movie theater. She explains that Johnny invented a "resurrection suit" that could give him control over anyone with special metal implants. Though Johnny had the right hand glove, she stole the rest of the suit and that is why Johnny is chasing her.

A concert promoter named King Clayton (Reggie Bannister) comes to Johnny and reveals where Bliss is heading. Clayton then asks for a favor in return for the information. He explains that Johnny's long-lost father and rock star Mickey O'Flynn (Creed Bratton) died suddenly and he wants Johnny to use the resurrection suit to control the musician's corpse for a concert. Johnny agrees to do so because doing an unselfish act will allow him and his gang to return to their home planet.

Gang member Sluggo (Jed Rowen), however, overloads the resurrection suit during the show and this causes O'Flynn to become a zombie. Sluggo and O'Flynn then leave the concert hall together. They track down Bliss, whom Sluggo drugs and kidnaps.

Sluggo demands Johnny bring him the resurrection suit so he can fulfill a plan to create a whole army of zombies. Johnny complies and reunites with O'Flynn. As his zombie father dies for a second time, he tells Johnny not to fail Bliss like he failed Johnny. The gang puts up a fight and defeats Sluggo. This is just the selfless act they need to be allowed to return to their home planet.

Johnny and Bliss, however, decide to stay on Earth and drive away together.

Cast
 Will Keenan as Johnny X
 Creed Bratton as Mickey O'Flynn
 De Anna Joy Brooks as Bliss
 Reggie Bannister as King Clayton
 Les Williams as Chip
 Jed Rowen as Sluggo
 Kate Maberly as Dandi Conners
 Paul Williams as Cousin Quilty
 Kevin McCarthy as The Grand Inquisitor

Reception
The film opened in a single theater on October 26, 2012 and grossed $86 in the first weekend. At the end of its run (of merely two theaters), the film had grossed $2,436.

References

External links
 
 
 
 

2012 films
2010s musical comedy films
2010s science fiction comedy films
American science fiction comedy films
American musical comedy films
2012 independent films
Films shot in California
Films shot in Los Angeles
American independent films
American black-and-white films
2012 comedy films
2010s English-language films
2010s American films